The State Highway 34 Bridge at the Trinity River near Rosser, Texas was built in 1933–34.  It brought State Highway 34 across the Trinity River, between Ellis County, Texas and Kaufman County, Texas.

The bridge was designed by the Texas Highway Department;  the main truss was the Texas Highway Department's T22-150 standard design. The truss fabricator was Petroleum Iron Works Co. and the bridge builder was the Austin Bridge Co.

The main span was a  riveted Parker through truss;  there were 53 smaller I-beam spans.  Also two additional structures, included in the listing, spanned "borrow pits" outside the levees of the Trinity River.

The bridge was replaced in 1996.

References

External links
Historic Bridges of Texas, 1866-1945 MPS

Bridges in Texas
National Register of Historic Places in Ellis County, Texas
National Register of Historic Places in Kaufman County, Texas
Bridges completed in 1933